"Mission Cleopatra" is a song by American rapper Snoop Dogg and French comedian Jamel Debbouze. It was released in April 2002 as the single for the soundtrack to the 2002 film Asterix & Obelix: Mission Cleopatra with the record labels Doggystyle Records, Priority Records and Capitol Records.

Track listing
CD single
"Mission Cleopatra" (with Jamel Debbouze) — 3:51
"Mission Cleopatra" (Instrumental) — 3:52

Chart performance

Weekly charts

Certifications

References

2002 singles
Snoop Dogg songs
Songs written by Snoop Dogg
2002 songs
Capitol Records singles